René Swete (born 11 June 1990) is an Austrian former professional footballer who last played as a goalkeeper for Austrian Bundesliga club TSV Hartberg.

References

Austrian footballers
1990 births
Living people
Footballers from Vienna
Favoritner AC players
1. Simmeringer SC players
Floridsdorfer AC players
SV Grödig players
TSV Hartberg players
Austrian Football Bundesliga players
2. Liga (Austria) players
Association football goalkeepers